Manavgat Waterfall on the Manavgat River is near the city of Side,  north of Manavgat, Turkey. Its high flow over a wide area as it falls from a low height is best viewed from a high altitude.

The white, foaming water of the Manavgat Waterfalls flows powerfully over the rocks. Near the waterfalls are shady tea gardens providing a pleasant resting place.

During floods, the Manavgat Falls may disappear under high water.

The waterfall was depicted on the reverse of the Turkish 5 lira banknotes of 1968-1983.

External links
Manavgat and Side

References

Waterfalls of Turkey
Tourist attractions in Antalya Province
Landforms of Antalya Province